Events in the year 1926 in Germany.

Incumbents

National level
President
Paul von Hindenburg (Non-partisan)

Chancellor
 Hans Luther (German People's Party) to 12 May, then from 17 May Wilhelm Marx (Centre) (2nd term)

Events
 1 January – the city of Cologne is badly hit by flooding in the river Rhine.
 6 January – Deutsche Luft Hansa is formed by the merger of Deutsche Aero Lloyd and Junkers Luftverkehr
 7 January – Deutschlandsender, a radio transmitter, is opened for the first time.
 20 January – Chancellor Hans Luther is forced to reconstitute his cabinet as a minority government, having lost the support of some of his partners the previous December.
 14 February – the Nazi Party hold the Bamberg Conference in an attempt to strengthen Adolf Hitler's control over the party.
 19 March – Max Wolf of the University of Heidelberg discovers the asteroid 2732 Witt.
 11 April – Hermannplatz railway station opens in Berlin.
 24 April – Treaty of Berlin (1926) is signed with the Soviet Union promising a five-year period of non-involvement if either state is attacked by a third party.
 16 May – Wilhelm Marx succeeds Luther as Chancellor although otherwise the make-up of the Cabinet is not altered.
 24 June – the liner Padua is launched. Other ships launched this year (all with date of launch unknown) include SS Amrum, SS Ilse L M Russ and SS Siegmund.
 28 June – German company Daimler-Benz was founded.
 3 September – Funkturm Berlin radio tower is opened to the public.
 8 September – Germany officially joins the League of Nations.
 1 November – Joseph Goebbels is appointed Nazi Gauleiter of Berlin.
 17 December – The Marx administration loses a vote of confidence and, although Marx continues as Chancellor, he does so without the involvement of previous coalition partners the German Democratic Party.

Date unknown
 The National Socialist German Students' League is established.
 The Old Social Democratic Party of Germany and the Reich Party for Civil Rights and Deflation are both established.
 Gustav Stresemann is awarded the Nobel Peace Prize along with fellow architect of the Locarno Treaties Aristide Briand.
 German company Südzucker was founded.

Popular culture

Arts
 27 March – Der Protagonist, an opera by Kurt Weill, is performed for the first time at Semperoper in Dresden.
 9 November – Paul Hindemith's opera Cardillac is premiered at the Staatsoper, Dresden.
 14 November – Der Golem, an opera by Eugen d'Albert receives its premiere at the Alte Oper in Frankfurt.
 27 November – Ernst Krenek's opera Orpheus und Eurydike premieres at the Staatstheater in Kassel.
 The Adventures of Prince Achmed by Lotte Reiniger is released. It is the oldest surviving animated feature film.

Sport
 11 July – The German Grand Prix makes its first appearance on the sporting calendar. The event is won by Rudolf Caracciola.
 1. FC Nürnberg are crowned German football champions.
 SV Wehen Wiesbaden and FSV 1926 Fernwald are amongst the new association football clubs set up.
 Berliner RC, a Rugby Union club, are established.

Births

 2 January – Valéry Giscard d'Estaing, President of France (died 2020 in France)
 3 January – W. Michael Blumenthal, German-American economist and politician 
 5 January – Walther Leisler Kiep, German politician (died 2016)
 6 January – Walter Sedlmayr, actor (died 1990)
 24 January – Hans-Jürgen Borchers, mathematical physicist (died 2011)
 26 January – Kurt-Heinz Stolze, pianist (died 1970)
 28 January – Meier Schwarz, Israeli plant physiologist (died 2022 in Israel)
 29 January – Ernst Träger, judge (died 2015)
 31 January:
 Johannes Joachim Degenhardt, Archbishop of Paderborn (died 2002)
 Horst Giese, actor (died 2008)
 Rudi Kopp, cross country skier
 Maria Emanuel, Margrave of Meissen, noblewoman (died 2012)
 2 February – Fritz Stern, German-American historian (died 2016)
 3 February
 Franz Islacker, footballer (died 1970)
 Hans-Jochen Vogel, politician (died 2020)
 8 February – Sonja Ziemann, actress (died 2019)
 11 February – Ursula Buckel, opera singer (died 2005)
 16 February – Margot Frank, sister of Anne Frank (died 1945) 
 20 February – Adolf Bechtold, footballer (died 2012)
 23 February – Christian Habicht, historian (died 2018)
 11 March:
 Albrecht Dietz, German entrepreneur and scientist (died 2012)
 Heinz Kiessling, musician (died 2003)
 Peer Schmidt, actor (died 2010)
 17 March – Siegfried Lenz, writer of novels, short stories and essays (died 2014)
 25 March – Georg Schäfer (artist), painter and writer (died 1991)
 26 March – Heinz Staab, German chemist (died 2012)
 8 April – Elisabeth Wiedemann, German actress (died 2015)
 18 April:
 Horst Käsler, handball player (died 1987)
 Günter Meisner, actor (died 1994)
 22 April – Harald Leipnitz, actor (died 2000)
 26 April – Michael Mathias Prechtl, artist (died 2003)
 8 May – David Hurst, actor (died 2019)
 17 May – Franz Sondheimer, German-born Israeli-British chemist (died 1981)
 19 May – Peter Zadek, film director (died 2009)
 24 May – Rudolf Kippenhahn, astrophysicist (died 2020)
 28 May – Gerhard Beil, politician (died 2010)
 5 June – Johannes, 11th Prince of Thurn and Taxis, businessman (died 1990)
 14 June – Hermann Kant, writer (died 2016)
 20 June – Hans-Dieter Lange, journalist and television presenter (died 2012)
 21 June – Johanna Quandt, business woman (died 2015)
 24 June – Walter Hirrlinger, German politician (died 2018)
 22 June – Elyakim Haetzni, Israeli lawyer and politician (died 2022) 
 1 July 
 Carl Hahn, businessman (died 2023)
 Hans Werner Henze, composer (died 2012)
 2 July – Berthold Wulf, priest (died 2012)
 4 July – Wolfgang Seidel, racing driver (died 1987)
 12 July – Oswald Mathias Ungers, architect (died 2007)
 15 July – Hans Frankenthal, writer and Holocaust survivor (died 1999)
 16 July – Stef Wertheimer, German-born Israeli entrepreneur and industrialist
 24 July – Hans Günter Winkler, showjumper (died 2018)
 25 July – August Lütke-Westhüs, equestrian (died 2000)
 1 August – Theo Adam, opera singer (died 2019)
 6 August – Moritz, Landgrave of Hesse (died 2013)
 9 August – Gustav Schmidt, sprint canoer (died 2016)
 21 August – Ben-Zion Orgad, (German-born) Israeli composer (died 2006)
 27 August – Karl-Heinz Heddergott, football manager
 30 August – Rudi Gutendorf, footballer and manager (died 2019)
 3 September:
 Rudi Arnstadt, East German border guard (died 1962)
 Jochen Bleicken, professor of ancient history (died 2005)
 4 September – Helmut Ringelmann, film producer (died 2011)
 6 September – Prince Claus of the Netherlands (died 2002)
 10 September – Gerda Munsinger, prostitute and alleged spy (died 1998)
 17 September 
 Hermann Bausinger, cultural scientist (died 2021)
 Klaus Schütz, politician (died 2012)
 1 October 
 Manfred Messerschmidt, historian (died 2022)
 Gerhard Stolze, opera singer (died 1979)
 4 October – Klaus Koch, theologian (died 2019)
 5 October – Gottfried Michael Koenig, composer (died 2021)
 8 October – Günter Mittag, politician (died 1994)
 14 October – Günther Schwarberg, journalist (died 2008)
 15 October – Karl Richter, conductor (died 1981)
 18 October – Klaus Kinski, actor (died 1991)
 19 October – Udo Schaefer, Baháʼí author (died 2019)
 20 October – Ursula Happe, swimmer
 21 October – Leo Kirch, media entrepreneur (died 2011)
 26 October – Bernhard Klodt, footballer (died 1996)
 30 October – Dieter Zechlin, pianist (died 2012)
 1 November – Günter de Bruyn, writer (died 2020)
 15 November:
 Alfred Biehle, politician (died 2014)
 Manfred Müller, German bishop or Roman Catholic Church (died 2015) 
 Helmut Fischer, actor (died 1997)
 26 November 
 Peter van Pels, German-Dutch boyfriend of Anne Frank (died 1945)  
 Ralf Wolter, actor
 28 November – Eberhard von Brauchitsch, industrialist (died 2010)
 9 December – Erhard Eppler, politician and businessman (died 2019)
 10 December – Jacob Birnbaum, Jewish activist (died 2014)
 16 December – Alfred Koerppen, musician (died 2022)
 19 December – Hans Henn, bobsledder
 20 December – Otto Graf Lambsdorff, politician (died 2019)
 21 December – Herbert Ehrenberg, politician (died 2018)
 23 December – Heinz Graffunder, architect (died 1994)

Deaths
 2 February – Karl von Weizsäcker, politician (born 1853)
 4 January – Franz Stockhausen, conductor (born 1839)
 7 January – Paul Cassirer, art dealer (born 1871)
 29 January – Wilhelm Heitmüller, theologian (born 1869)
 5 February – Gustav Eberlein, sculptor and painter (born 1847)
 6 February – Wolf Wilhelm Friedrich von Baudissin, theologian (born 1847)
 11 February – Friedrich Wilhelm Kuhnert, painter (born 1865)
 13 February – Friedrich Krafft Graf von Crailsheim, German politician (born 1841)
 20 February – Georg Friedrich Knapp, economist (born 1842)
 28 February – Gustav Otto, aircraft engineer (born 1883)
 7 March – Paul Matschie, zoologist (born 1861)
 24 March – Sizzo, Prince of Schwarzburg, nobleman (born 1860)
 26 March – Constantin Fehrenbach, politician (born 1852)
 4 April – August Thyssen, industrialist (born 1842)
 21 May – Friedrich Kluge, lexicographer (born 1856)
 23 May – Hans von Koessler, composer (born 1853)
 3 June – Rudolf Oeser, politician (born 1858)
 5 June – Richard Wolffenstein, chemist (born 1864)
 22 July – Otto Wilhelm Madelung, surgeon (born 1846)
 23 July – Kurt Wüsthoff, fighter pilot (born 1897)
 5 September – Karl Harrer, journalist and politician (born 1890)
 15 September – Rudolf Christoph Eucken, philosopher (born 1846)
 7 October – Emil Kraepelin, psychiatrist (born 1856)
 9 October – Josias von Heeringen, Army general (born 1850)
 15 October – Mathilde Bauermeister, opera singer (born 1849)
 17 October – Otto Heubner, internist and pediatrician (born 1843)
 26 November – Fritz Cassirer, conductor (born 1871)
 2 December – Karl Joseph Eberth, pathologist (born 1835)
 11 December – Carl Magnus von Hell, chemist (born 1849)

References

 
Years of the 20th century in Germany
Germany
Germany